Cloud is an unincorporated community in Marion County, Iowa, United States.

History
Cloud was founded in the 1800s. Cloud's population was 14 in 1902.

Notable people
Hardin B. Cloud, Iowa state legislator, farmer, and merchant lived in Cloud; he also served as postmaster for Cloud.

Notes

Unincorporated communities in Marion County, Iowa
Unincorporated communities in Iowa